Choqa Bur-e Darabi (also Romanized as Choqā Būr-e Dārābī; also known as Chaqā Būr-e Dārāb and Choqā Būr-e Dārāb) is a village in Gurani Rural District, Gahvareh District, Dalahu County, Kermanshah Province, Iran. At the 2006 census, its population was 135, in 33 families.

References 

Populated places in Dalahu County